is a 1997 Japanese drama film based on the novel A Lost Paradise by Junichi Watanabe.

Cast 
Kōji Yakusho - Shoichiro Kuki
Hitomi Kuroki - Rinko Matsubaro
Akira Terao - Kinugawa
Toshio Shiba - Haruhiko Matsubara
Tomoko Hoshino - Fumie Kuki (wife)
Yoshino Kimura - Chika (daughter)

Release
Lost Paradise was the second highest grossing Japanese film of 1997 domestically in Japan being only beaten by Princess Mononoke. It grossed a total of 2.3 billion yen.

References

External links 

1990s erotic drama films
Films based on Japanese novels
Films directed by Yoshimitsu Morita
Japanese erotic drama films
1997 drama films
1997 films
1990s Japanese films